Kentucky Route 499 (KY 499) is a  state highway in Lee County, Kentucky that runs from U.S. Route 25 south of Richmond to Kentucky Route 89 northwest of Irvine via Speedwell and Witt.

Major intersections

References

0499
Transportation in Madison County, Kentucky
Transportation in Estill County, Kentucky